Susan Hampshire, Lady Kulukundis,  (born 12 May 1937) is an English actress known for her many television and film roles. A three-time Emmy Award winner, she won for The Forsyte Saga in 1970, The First Churchills in 1969, and for Vanity Fair in 1973. Her other television credits include The Pallisers (1974), The Grand (1997–98) and Monarch of the Glen (2000–2005).

Early life
Susan Hampshire was born in Kensington, London, to George Kenneth Hampshire and his wife  June (née Pavey) and is of Irish descent. The youngest of five children, she had three sisters and one brother. Her mother was a teacher and her father was a director of Imperial Chemical Industries who was rarely at home, her parents having unofficially separated. As a child, she had some developmental difficulties, unable to spell her name until she was nine and unable to read well until she was 12. Her determined mother founded a small London school in 1928, The Hampshire (now Gems Hampshire School), where Susan was taught.

Her childhood ambition was to be a nurse, but she did not have the O level in Latin it required, so she decided to become an actress. She was diagnosed as dyslexic at the age of 30.

Career
As an actress, Hampshire worked in the theatre before moving to film and television work. She took the title role in a dramatised version of Little Black Sambo recorded by HMV Junior Record Club in 1961 (words by David Croft, music by Cyril Ornadel) and sang on The Midday Show when ITV Anglia began broadcasting (as Anglia Television) in 1959. Her first starring role was in the film During One Night in 1960. She then took the leading role in a 1962 BBC adaptation of What Katy Did. Soon afterwards, she was taken up by Walt Disney and starred in The Three Lives of Thomasina (opposite Patrick McGoohan) and The Fighting Prince of Donegal. She would later appear opposite McGoohan again, in two episodes of Danger Man. She co-starred with Cliff Richard in Sidney J. Furie's 1964 musical Wonderful Life.

In 1966, she was introduced to American TV viewers in the pilot episode of The Time Tunnel as a young passenger on the Titanic who befriends Dr Tony Newman. She later portrayed conservationist Joy Adamson in Living Free, the sequel to Born Free. In 1972, she played three different characters in Malpertuis, directed by Harry Kumel. She is known for her work on television, appearing in several popular television serials, including The Andromeda Breakthrough (1962) in which she replaced Julie Christie who was not available for the show but had played the part of Andromeda in the first season of A for Andromeda (1961). Her most notable television role in the 1960s came in the BBC's 1967 adaptation of The Forsyte Saga, in which she played Fleur.

Hampshire received Emmy Awards from the Academy of Television Arts & Sciences for her roles in The Forsyte Saga (1970), The First Churchills (1969) and Vanity Fair (1973). In 1973, she appeared again on US television with Kirk Douglas in a musical version of Dr. Jekyll and Mr. Hyde. Other miniseries in which she appeared are The Pallisers, The Barchester Chronicles and Coming Home. She was the subject of This Is Your Life in 1992 when she was surprised by Michael Aspel at the Ritz Hotel. In 1997, she appeared in the ITV television series The Grand where she played a madame residing in the hotel. More recent TV roles include Molly MacDonald, Lady of Glenbogle, in Monarch of the Glen (2000–05)/and an appearance in Casualty (Series 26, No Goodbyes, 19 November 2011) as Caitlin Northwick. 

Hampshire has been active on the stage, taking the lead roles in many leading plays. In 2007, she was in the  play The Bargain, based on a meeting between Robert Maxwell and Mother Teresa. She played the Fairy Godmother in pantomime at the New Wimbledon Theatre in 2005–06 and at the New Victoria Theatre in Woking in 2006–07. In 2008, she joined the relatively small band of actors who have played two generations in the same play on different occasions. Her appearance at the Chichester Festival Theatre in Somerset Maugham's The Circle as Lady Catherine Champion-Cheney in 2008 followed on from her appearance in the same play (and venue) as Elizabeth Champion-Cheney (Lady Catherine's daughter-in-law) in 1976.

Author and charity work
Until the publication in 1981 of her autobiography, Susan's Story, few people were aware of Hampshire's struggle with dyslexia. Since then, she has become a prominent campaigner in the UK on dyslexia issues and was president of the Dyslexia Institute from 1995 to 1998.

Her second book, The Maternal Instinct (1984), discussed women and fertility issues and she published a collection of interviews, Every Letter Counts: Winning in Life Despite Dyslexia, in 1990. She has written children's books, including Lucy Jane at the Ballet, Lucy Jane and the Russian Ballet, Lucy Jane and the Dancing Competition, Lucy Jane on Television, Bear's Christmas, Rosie's First Ballet Lesson and Rosie's Ballet Slippers as well as various books and videos about her lifelong hobby of gardening, including Easy Gardening, My Secret Garden and Trouble Free Gardening.

She is a patron of the British Homeopathic Association, HIV charity Body Positive Dorset, The National Osteoporosis Society, Dignity in Dying and population concern charity Population Matters. She is also patron of Mousetrap Theatre Projects in London which supports theatre productions for the enjoyment of disadvantaged and disabled children. She holds the position of vice-president at Juvenile Diabetes Research Foundation Ltd, UK. She is also a vice-president of The International Tree Foundation.

Personal life
Hampshire was married to her first husband, the French film producer Pierre Granier-Deferre, from 1967 until 1974. The couple have a son, Christopher. Their daughter, Victoria, died within 24 hours of her birth.

She was married to her second husband, theatre impresario Sir Eddie Kulukundis, from 1981 until his death in 2021.

Hampshire was appointed Officer of the Order of the British Empire (OBE) in the 1995 Birthday Honours, for services to dyslexic people. In the 2018 New Year Honours, she was made Commander of the Order of the British Empire (CBE), for services to drama and charity.

Filmography

References

External links
 
 
 

1937 births
Living people
20th-century English actresses
Actors with dyslexia
Actresses from London
Commanders of the Order of the British Empire
English film actresses
English non-fiction writers
English people of Irish descent
English stage actresses
English television actresses
Outstanding Performance by a Lead Actress in a Drama Series Primetime Emmy Award winners
Outstanding Performance by a Lead Actress in a Miniseries or Movie Primetime Emmy Award winners
People from Kensington
Wives of knights
Writers from London